Republicain, republicaine, Le Républicain, La Républicaine, Les républicains, or variant, may refer to:

 French ship Républicain, several ships of France by the name "Républicain" or "Républicaine"

Newspapers
 Le Républicain (Niger), a newspaper in Niamey, Niger
 L'Est Républicain (The East Republican) Nancy, France; a newspaper
 Le Républicain Lorrain (The Lorraine Republican) Metz, France; a newspaper

Political parties
 Parti republicain/Republican Party (Canada)
 Parti républicain du Québec (PRQ) the Republican Party of Quebec
 Mouvement républicain populaire (MRP) a Christian democrat party of France
 Mouvement National Republicain (MNR) a nationalist party of France
 Les Républicains (LR) a centre-right party of France
 Parti républicain (PR) a liberal-conservative party of France
 Rassemblement des Republicains (RDR) a liberal party of Ivory Coast
 Mouvement Républicain (MR) a political party of Mauritius
 Mouvement Démocratique Républicain (MDR) a political party of Rwanda
 Mouvement Republicain Sénégalais (MRS) Republican Movement of Senegal
 Parti Républicain de Vanuatu (PRV) Vanuatu Republican Party
 Parti Républicain Dahoméen (PRD) Republican Party of Dahomey

See also
 French frigate Républicaine française (1794)
 Republican (disambiguation)
 République (disambiguation)
 Republic (disambiguation)